Thoma is a version of Thomas, originating from Aramaic t’om’a, meaning ‘twin’, and may refer to:
Antonius von Thoma (1829–1897), German Roman Catholic archbishop
Annette Thoma (1886-1974), German composer
Busso Thoma (1899–1945), German army officer; hanged for his part in the July 20 assassination attempt on Hitler
Dan J. Thoma (b. 1963), American metallurgist and professor
Dieter Thoma (b. 1969), German Olympic ski jumper
Georg Thoma (b. 1937), German Olympic skier
Godfrey Thoma (born 1957), Nauruan politician
Hans Thoma (1839–1924), German artist
Hans Thoma (engineer), Germany engineer, inventor of the bent-axis axial piston pump/motor, the "Thoma-design", USPTO patent No. 2155455, 1935.
Heini Thoma (b. 1900, d. unknown), Swiss Olympic rower
Ludwig Thoma (1867–1921), German author, editor, and publisher
Maralyn Thoma, American soap opera television writer
Thoma (scholar) (died 1127), Moorish Spaniard author and scholar
Thoma, a playable character in Genshin Impact
Thoma Avenir, one of the main characters in the manga Magical Record Lyrical Nanoha Force
Wilhelm Ritter von Thoma (1891–1948), German army officer
Other
5492 Thoma, main-belt asteroid

German-language surnames